An occupational exposure limit is an upper limit on the acceptable concentration of a hazardous substance in workplace air for a particular material or class of materials. It is typically set by competent national authorities and enforced by legislation to protect occupational safety and health. It is an important tool in risk assessment and in the management of activities involving handling of dangerous substances. There are many dangerous substances for which there are no formal occupational exposure limits. In these cases, hazard banding or control banding strategies can be used to ensure safe handling.

Background 

Occupational Exposure Limits (OELs) have been established for airborne workplace chemicals by multiple regulatory and authoritative organizations around the world for well over 60 years now.  With the changing regulatory arena, shifting centers of manufacturing growth, and the move towards a more global view on occupational hygiene issues, it is important for the Occupational Hygiene profession to understand the current and growing issues impacting the continued viability of OEL's in our professional practice.

Although peer-reviewed health-based OELs are preferred for establishing safe levels of exposure or for implementing adequate controls to provide worker protection, the lack of publicly available OELs have led to other sources of safe levels to protect workers.  Industrial or Occupational Hygienists are often on the front line of anticipating and recognizing the hazards of chemical exposure for workers, and must assess the risk of exposure through the use of OELs so that proper control strategies can be implemented to keep workers below the OEL values.  In the absence of OELs however, there are a variety of tools that can and should be used to assess exposure potential of workers.  The "Hierarchy of OELs" provides a continuum of occupational exposure limit values that allow assessment of the risk of exposure in order to apply adequate controls.

Personal air sampling is routinely conducted on workers to determine whether exposures are acceptable or unacceptable.  These samples are collected and analyzed using validated sampling and analytical methods.  These methods are available from OSHA Technical Manual and NIOSH Manual of Analytical Methods   Statistical tools are available to assess exposure monitoring data against OELs.  The statistical tools are typically free but do require some previous knowledge with statistical concepts.  A popular exposure data statistical tool called "IH STAT" is available from AIHA (American Industrial Hygiene Association).  IHSTAT has 14 languages including English and is available for free.

Methods for performing occupational exposure assessments can be found in "A Strategy for Assessing and Managing Occupational Exposures, Third Edition Edited by Joselito S. Ignacio and William H. Bullock".

With the World Health Organization and the International Labour Office having now quantified the global burden of disease from psychosocial occupational hazards, identification of OELs for such hazards is increasingly becoming a focus of attention for occupational safety and health policy and practice.

Types
 Permissible exposure limit, set by the U.S. Occupational Safety and Health Administration
 Recommended exposure limit, set by the U.S. National Institute for Occupational Safety and Health
 Indicative limit value, set by the European Union
 Threshold limit value, set by the American Conference of Governmental Industrial Hygienists
 Occupational exposure banding, a process that can be used when not enough data are available to determine quantitative exposure limits

International limit values 
The database ″GESTIS - International limit values for chemical agents″ contains a collection of occupational limit values for hazardous substances collected from 35 lists from 29 countries: various EU member states, Australia, Canada, Israel, Japan, New Zealand, Singapore, South Korea, Switzerland, China, Turkey, and the United States. The database comprises values of more than 2,000 substances.

The present database was elaborated in co-operation with experts from various international occupational safety and health institutions. It aims to give an overview of limit values in different countries. Since the limit values vary in their handling, the level of protection, and their legal relevance, the original lists of limit values and the explanations there should be considered as primary sources. Also the chemical nomenclature is diverging, synonyms can for example be found in the GESTIS Substance Database.

The database is also available as an app for mobile terminals with Android or iOS operating systems.

See also 
 
 
 
 
 
 
 
 
  A method to make invisible hazards in the work environment visible and thus facilitate the reduction of hazards and risks in workplaces

References

Bibliography
 (Google Books)

External links
National Institute for Occupational Safety and Health, USA.
Occupational Safety and Health Administration, Permissible Exposure Limits in the US. 
Proposals to introduce a new occupational exposure limits (OEL) framework HSC Consultative Document
Discussion document on Occupational Exposure Limits (OEL) framework (HSE, UK)
OELs and the effective control of exposure to substances hazardous to health in the UK (HSE paper)
EH40/2005 Workplace exposure limits (HSE, UK)
Occupational Exposure Limits Summary - EU Member States
The role of occupational exposure limits in the health and safety systems of EU Member States by D Walters and others. Health and Safety Executive Research Report No. 172/2003
Occupational exposure limits and their economic costs by J Cherrie. Institute of Occupational Medicine Research Report TM/86/02
The IOM’s position on occupational exposure limits for dust Institute of Occupational Medicine Position Paper

Labour law
Occupational safety and health
Toxicology